Transliteration is a type of conversion of a text from one script to another that involves swapping letters (thus trans- + liter-) in predictable ways, such as Greek  → , Cyrillic  → , Greek  → the digraph , Armenian  →  or Latin  → .

Transliteration is not primarily concerned with representing the sounds of the original but rather with representing the characters, ideally accurately and unambiguously.

Angle brackets  may be used to set off transliteration, as opposed to slashes  for phonemic transcription and square brackets for phonetic transcription. Angle brackets may also be used to set off characters in the original script. Conventions and author preferences vary.

Definitions
Systematic transliteration is a mapping from one system of writing into another, typically grapheme to grapheme. Most transliteration systems are one-to-one, so a reader who knows the system can reconstruct the original spelling.

Transliteration is opposed to transcription, which maps the sounds of one language into a writing system. Still, most systems of transliteration map the letters of the source script to letters pronounced similarly in the target script, for some specific pair of source and target language. Transliteration may be very close to transcription if the relations between letters and sounds are similar in both languages. In practice, there are some mixed transliteration/transcription systems that transliterate a part of the original script and transcribe the rest.

For many script pairs, there are one or more standard transliteration systems. However, unsystematic transliteration is common.

Difference from transcription
In Modern Greek, the letters ⟨η⟩ ⟨ι⟩ ⟨υ⟩ and the letter combinations ⟨ει⟩ ⟨oι⟩ ⟨υι⟩ are pronounced  (except when pronounced as semivowels), and a modern transcription renders them all as ⟨i⟩; but a transliteration distinguishes them, for example by transliterating to ⟨ē⟩ ⟨i⟩ ⟨y⟩ and ⟨ei⟩ ⟨oi⟩ ⟨yi⟩. On the other hand, ⟨ευ⟩ is sometimes pronounced  and sometimes , depending on the following sound. A transcription distinguishes them, but this is no requirement for a transliteration. The initial letter 'h' reflecting the historical rough breathing in words such as Ellēnikē should logically be omitted in transcription from Koine Greek on, and from transliteration from 1982 on, but it is nonetheless frequently encountered.

Challenges
A simple example of difficulties in transliteration is the Arabic letter qāf. It is pronounced, in literary Arabic, approximately like English [k], except that the tongue makes contact not on the soft palate but on the uvula, but the pronunciation varies between different dialects of Arabic. The letter is sometimes transliterated into "g", sometimes into "q" and rarely even into "k" in English. Another example is the Russian letter "Х" (kha). This sound is not present in most forms of English and is often transliterated as "kh" as in Nikita Khrushchev. Many languages have phonemic sounds, such as click consonants, which are quite unlike any phoneme in the language into which they are being transliterated.

Some languages and scripts present particular difficulties to transcribers. These are discussed on separate pages.

 Ancient Near East
 Transliterating cuneiform languages
 Transliteration of Ancient Egyptian (see also Egyptian hieroglyphs)
 Hieroglyphic Luwian
 Armenian language
 Avestan
 Brahmic family 
 Devanagari: see Devanagari transliteration
 Pali
 Tocharian
 Malayalam: see Romanization of Malayalam
 Chinese language
 Transcription into Chinese characters
 Romanization of Chinese
 Cyrillization of Chinese
 Click languages of Africa
 Khoisan languages
 Bantu languages
 English language
 Hebraization of English
 Greek language
 Romanization of Greek
 Greek alphabet
 Linear B
 Greeklish
 Japanese language
 Romanization of Japanese
 Cyrillization of Japanese
 Khmer language
 Romanization of Khmer
 Korean language
 Romanization of Korean
 Persian language
 Persian alphabet
 Cyrillic alphabet
 Romanization of Persian
 Persian chat alphabet
 Semitic languages
 Ugaritic alphabet
 Hebrew alphabet
 Romanization of Hebrew
 Arabic alphabet
 Romanization of Arabic
 Arabic chat alphabet
 Slavic languages written in the Cyrillic or Glagolitic alphabets
 Romanization of Belarusian
 Romanization of Bulgarian
 Romanization of Russian
 Romanization of Macedonian
 Romanization of Serbian
 Romanization of Ukrainian
 Volapuk encoding
 Thai language
 Romanization of Thai
 Urdu Language
Romanization of Urdu

Adopted

 Buckwalter transliteration
 Devanagari transliteration
 Hans Wehr transliteration
 International Alphabet of Sanskrit Transliteration
 Scientific transliteration of Cyrillic
 Transliteration of Ancient Egyptian
 Transliterations of Manchu
 Wylie transliteration

See also

 Cyrillization
 International Components for Unicode
 ISO 15924
 Latin script
 List of ISO transliterations
 Orthographic transcription
 Phonemic orthography
 Phonetic transcription
 Romanization
 Spread of the Latin script
 Substitution cipher
 Transcription (linguistics)

References

External links

 International Components for Unicode transliteration services ICU User Guide: Transforms
 Transliteration history  – history of the transliteration of Slavic languages into Latin alphabets.
 Transliteration of Non-Latin scripts – Collection of transliteration tables for many non-Latin scripts maintained by Thomas T. Pedersen.
 Unicode Transliteration Guidelines
 United Nations Group of Experts on Geographical Names (UNGEGN) – working group on Romanization Systems.
 Library of Congress: Romanization Tables
 Localtyping.com implements google transliteration library and also allows to create To-Do Lists in English and Transliterated Languages.
 onlinemarathityping.com Use Google transliteration for easy typing.
 Usage of Transliterations – condensed description of the definition of transliteration and its usage.
 G. Gerych. Transliteration of Cyrillic Alphabets. Ottawa University, April 1965. 126 pp. – historical overview of the concept of transliteration and its evolution and application